Black Velvet may refer to:

Music and entertainment
 The Black Velvets, an English rock band
 "Black Velvet" (song), a 1989 song by Alannah Myles
 "Black Velvet", a song by Ferry Corsten from the 2008 album Twice in a Blue Moon
 "Black Velvet", a song by Gass from the 1970 album Juju
 Black Velvet (Robin Lee album), 1990, featuring a cover of the song "Black Velvet"
 Black Velvet (O'Donel Levy album), 1971
 Black Velvet (revue), a revue at the London Hippodrome in 1939
 "Black Velvet", the former stage name taken by Charles Bradley when he performed as a James Brown impersonator
 Black Velvet (Charles Bradley album)
 Black Velvet (magazine), a British quarterly rock magazine
 Black Velvet or Schwarzer Samt, a 1964 German crime film
 "Don'cha Go 'Way Mad", a song originally recorded in 1949 as an instrumental called "Black Velvet"
 Black Velvet, Estonian band

Beverages
 Black Velvet (whisky), a Canadian whiskey
 Black Velvet (beer cocktail), a mixed drink

Other uses
 Black Velvet, a fabric
 Velvet painting, the application of paint onto velvet fabric
 Black Velvet Travel, which operates a bus company in Eastleigh, Southampton